Fatjon Bushati (born 6 May 1998) is a Kosovan footballer who plays as a defensive midfielder for German club Ahrweiler.

Club career
Bushati joined Albanian side Besa Kavajë in January 2018 from KF Ballkani alongside compatriot Bler Thaçi, who joined from KF KEK.

Career statistics

Club

Notes

References

1998 births
Living people
Sportspeople from Prizren
Kosovan footballers
Association football midfielders
KF Ballkani players
Besa Kavajë players
Football Superleague of Kosovo players
Kategoria e Parë players
Kosovan expatriate footballers
Kosovan expatriate sportspeople in Albania
Expatriate footballers in Albania